Strien (or van Strien) is a Dutch surname. Notable people with the surname include:

 Gom van Strien (born 1951), Dutch politician
 Nicolaas Jan van Strien (1946–2008), Dutch zoologist and conservationist
 Pim van Strien (born 1977), Dutch politician
 Ton Strien (born 1958), Dutch politician